PFC CSKA Sofia, otherwise simply known as CSKA or CSKA Sofia, is a professional football club based in Sofia, Bulgaria.

This is a list of the club's achievements in major competitions in Bulgarian and European football. It covers all seasons from 1948 (the birthyear of CSKA) to the most recent completed season.

CSKA Sofia has taken part in all national football championships since they are officially organized and has played only one season outside the top division of the Bulgarian football championship.

The club has won 31 league titles, 21 Bulgarian cups and 4 Bulgarian supercups.

Key

 P = Played
 W = Games won
 D = Games drawn
 L = Games lost
 F = Goals for
 A = Goals against
 Pts = Points
 Pos = Final position

 SC = Sofia Championship
 RFC = Republic Football Championship
 A Group = A Football Group
 Prem = Premier football league
 V AFG = V Amateur Football League
 FL = First Professional Football league
 CSA = Cup of the Soviet Army
 BC = Bulgarian Cup

 QR = Qualifying Round
 QR1 = First Qualifying Round
 QR2 = Second Qualifying Round
 QR3 = Third Qualifying Round
 QR4 = Fourth Qualifying Round
 PO = Play-off Round
 GR = Group Stage
 FGR = Final Group Stage

 R1 = Round 1
 R2 = Round 2
 R3 = Round 3
 R4 = Round 4
 R5 = Round 5
 R6 = Round 6
 QF = Quarter-finals
 SF = Semi-finals

Seasons

Footnotes

 Seasons at the CSKA Sofia fan page

Seasons

CSKA Sofia